The Boone House is a historic home in St. Petersburg, Florida, United States. It was built in 1910 in the Colonial Revival style of architecture.  According to a 1978 survey of 26 other homes that were built no later than 1910, only the Willard and the Boone Houses feature masonry construction. The house is named after Benjamin T. Boone, who  devoted himself to real estate development in St. Petersburg.  It is located at 601 Fifth Avenue North. On July 3, 1986, it was added to the U.S. National Register of Historic Places.

References

External links

 Pinellas County listings at National Register of Historic Places
 Florida's Office of Cultural and Historical Programs
 Pinellas County listings
 Boone House

Houses on the National Register of Historic Places in Florida
National Register of Historic Places in Pinellas County, Florida
Houses in St. Petersburg, Florida
Houses completed in 1910
1910 establishments in Florida